Eucereon tarona is a moth of the subfamily Arctiinae. It was described by George Hampson in 1898. It is found in Panama, Peru and São Paulo, Brazil.

References

 

tarona
Moths described in 1898